Matěj Paprčiak (born 3 May 1991) is a Czech former footballer who is currently a model and actor. He began his career at Slavia Prague and made his Gambrinus liga debut for Slavia against Dukla Prague on 16 September 2011. He was then loaned out to various clubs including ČFL (tier 3) side FK Králův Dvůr, Viktoria Žižkov and Admira Prague.

Paprčiak retired following a ligament injury. He then became a model and actor.

References

External links
 Profile at iDNES.cz
 

1991 births
Living people
Czech footballers
Association football forwards
SK Slavia Prague players
FK Viktoria Žižkov players
Czech First League players
Czech male models
Czech actors